Lisa is the first studio album by the Irish singer Lisa Kelly. It was released in 2003 by the Celtic Collections label. It was released again in 2006 as Celtic Woman Presents: Lisa under the Manhattan label.

Track listing

References

2003 debut albums